The December 1917 coup d'état was a politico-military uprising led by Sidónio Pais, which started in Lisbon, Portugal, with the objective of taking power from the Democratic Party, which had won every election in Portugal since the foundation of the Portuguese First Republic in October 1910.

Background 
Portugal was taking part in World War I, a participation that was largely unpopular due to its social and economic impacts, and that the government tried to contain using repressive measures. A conspiracy emerges within the Unionists, initially supported by its leader Manuel de Brito Camacho, but who later had a change of heart and did not participate in the coup. Sidónio Pais leads the coup, with the support of every political force except for the União Sagrada (a coalition between the Democratic Party and the Evolutionist Party).

Coup 
On the night of 5 December 1917, Sidónio Pais, with the support of multiple units of the Army, occupied the Eduardo VII Park and the main roads of access. The total rebel army forces were around 2.500 in number. José Norton de Matos, then war minister, takes command of the government forces, as both Afonso Costa (head of government) and Augusto Soares (foreign affairs minister) are out of the country. Norton commanded the forces from the Navy Arsenal and had the support of the Navy, National Republican Guard, the Fiscal Guard, the police, and some Army units.

On 6 December 1917, multiple houses and businesses are sacked as the police does not leave its quarters. The Navy, positioned in the Tagus river and led by Leote de Rego aboard the destroyer , exchange fire with the rebel forces in Eduardo VII.

On 7 December 1917, the government forces decide to take over the forces on Eduardo VII. A column of Navy and GNR members attempt a frontal attack from the Avenida. Another column attempts to attack from Rato, supported by artillery placed in the São Pedro de Alcântara garden (in Bairro Alto). These attacks are slow and unsuccessful.

On 8 December 1917, the government hands president Bernardino Machado its resignation.

Aftermath 
The facilities and houses of Democratic leaders are sacked. A Military Junta, led by Sidónio Pais, was then established. The Junta officially deposed the president, government and parliament. Afonso Costa and Augusto Soares were imprisoned as they returned to the country, Norton de Matos and Leote de Rego escaped in an English steamboat, and president Bernardino Machado was exiled by the Military Junta. The Military Junta only ruled for a few days, giving way, on 11 December 1917, to a government led by Sidónio Pais. Sidónio was later elected, in a general election, as president, after the regime was altered from a semi-presidential system to a full-presidential system. The casualties of the coup are registered as 109 dead and 500 wounded.

Gallery

See also 

 History of Portugal
 Joaquim Pimenta de Castro, the previous attempt to break the Democratic Party's uninterrupted rule.

References 

1917 in Portugal
Political history of Portugal
Conflicts in 1917
Military coups in Portugal